Roumégoux may refer to the following places in France:

 Roumégoux, Cantal, a commune in the Cantal department
 Roumégoux, Tarn, a commune in the Tarn department